Patrick Browne may refer to:

Patrick Browne (physician) (1720–1790), Irish physician and botanist
Patrick Browne (cricketer) (born 1982), Barbadian cricketer
Patrick Browne (Waterford politician) (1906–1991), Irish Fianna Fáil politician represented Waterford from 1965–1977
Patrick Browne (Mayo politician) (1888–1970), Irish Fine Gael politician represented Mayo North from 1937–1954
Patrick Browne (judge) (1907–1996), English judge
Pat Browne (born 1963), Pennsylvanian State Senator (R)
Pádraig de Brún (1889– 1960), also called Patrick Joseph Monsignor Browne, Irish clergyman, mathematician, poet, and classical scholar

See also
Patrick Brown (disambiguation)